Lake Streety is a natural freshwater lake in south Polk County, Florida. Both of these are small unincorporated communities. Lake Streety is just north of the Avon Park Cut Off Road and is bordered on the northeast by Lake Streety Road, which is a sand road. The lake has a  surface area.

There are no public swimming areas or boat ramps on the lake's shore.  However, since it borders Lake Streety Road, public fishing there is possible.  The HookandBullet.Com website says the lake contains bullhead, crappie and warmouth.

References

Streety